Eremophila splendens is a flowering plant in the figwort family, Scrophulariaceae and is endemic to Western Australia. It is a shrub which is mostly covered with a layer of glandular hairs and has red, unspotted flowers.

Description
The branches and leaves are covered with a dense layer of glandular hairs mixed with longer, soft, simple hairs.

The petal tube is red to orange-red and the petal lobes are wide-spreading. The outside of the petal tube and lobes are covered with glandular hairs but the inside is mostly glabrous. The 4 stamens extend beyond the end of the petal tube. Flowering mainly occurs between May and September and is followed by fruits which are nearly spherical drupes  in diameter with a glabrous, papery covering.

Taxonomy and naming 
Eremophila splendens was first formally described by Robert Chinnock in 2007 and the description was published in Eremophila and Allied Genera: A Monograph of the Plant Family Myoporaceae. The specific epithet (splendens) is a Latin word meaning "lustrous", "brilliant" or "glorious", referring to the "attractive" flowers.

Distribution and habitat 
This eremophila grows in yellow sand in the Shark Bay - Steep Point area in the Yalgoo biogeographic regions.

Conservation
Eremophila splendens is classified as "Priority One" by the Western Australian Government Department of Parks and Wildlife, meaning that it is known from only one or a few locations which are potentially at risk.

Use in horticulture
With its grey, furry leaves and masses of orange-red flowers, this is one of the most attractive eremophilas. It is fast-growing and its flowers attract nectar-feeding birds but it is often short lived. It can be easily propagated from cuttings and grown in a wide range of soils but performs best in full sun. It only needs an occasional watering during a long dry spell and is very tolerant of frost.

References

External links 
 

splendens
Eudicots of Western Australia
Endemic flora of Western Australia
Plants described in 2007
Taxa named by Robert Chinnock